Courtes is a commune in the Ain department in eastern France.

Geography
The Sâne Vive forms part of the commune's eastern border.

Climate
Courtes has a oceanic climate (Köppen climate classification Cfb).

Population

See also
Communes of the Ain department

References

Communes of Ain
Ain communes articles needing translation from French Wikipedia
Bresse